Boys from the Streets is a 1949 Norwegian drama film directed by Ulf Greber and Arne Skouen, starring, among others, Tom Tellefsen, Ivar Thorkildsen and Pål Bang-Hansen. The film takes place on the east side of Oslo in the early 1930s, and follows a group of young criminals who steal coconuts from passing trucks.

External links
 
 Gategutter at Filmweb.no (Norwegian)
 Gategutter at the Norwegian Film Institute

1949 films
1949 drama films
Films directed by Arne Skouen
Norwegian drama films
Norwegian black-and-white films
1940s Norwegian-language films